The ruined Paleochristian Basilica in Goricë is a Cultural Monument of Albania, located near Gjirokastër.

References

Cultural Monuments of Albania
Buildings and structures in Gjirokastër
Churches in Gjirokastër
Churches in Albania